The following is a list of webisodes for the Australian web series, Offspring: The Nurses.

, there have been 26 webisodes of Offspring: The Nurses released online.

Webisodes

Web Series 1 (2010)
The first web series follows nurses Kim (Alicia Gardiner) and Zara (Jane Harber) from the original series. Andrew Garrick wrote and directed the first series.

Series 1 also stars Benedict Hardie, Julia Grace, Laura Gilham, Carl Nilsson Polias, Jodie Sheehy and Matthew Heyward as fellow staff members of the Hospital.

Web Series 2 (2011)
The second web series again follows Zara (Jane Harber) and this time Justina Noble as Nurse Tyra. Benedict Hardie, who stars in the series, wrote with Andrew Garrick for the second series. Garrick again directed for the web series.

Series 2 also stars Benedict Hardie, Harry Milas, Josh Price, Natalie Kaplan, Sonja Kowanjko and Kate Hopkins. Richard Davies and Lachy Hulme also made guest appearances.

References

Lists of Australian drama television series episodes